Emma-Jane Davidson (born 1974) is a member of parliament in the Australian Capital Territory Legislative Assembly representing the ACT Greens.

Before entering politics Davidson's career has focused on advocacy for women, including as convenor of the Women's Electoral Lobby.

At the 2020 Australian Capital Territory general election Davidson won one of the five seats in Murrumbidgee.

References 

1974 births
Living people
Members of the Australian Capital Territory Legislative Assembly
21st-century Australian politicians
Women members of the Australian Capital Territory Legislative Assembly
Australian Greens members of the Australian Capital Territory Legislative Assembly
21st-century Australian women politicians